Corn crab soup is a dish found in Chinese cuisine, American Chinese cuisine, and Canadian Chinese cuisine. The soup is similar to cream of corn soup with egg white and crab meat or imitation crab meat added.

Regional
This soup is found in Chinese restaurants across Mainland China, Hong Kong, Taiwan, and some Southeast Asian nations such as Singapore, Malaysia, Indonesia, the Philippines, Thailand, and Vietnam. It is particularly popular in Hakka-speaking regions of southern China and Taiwan. It is also popular in Chinese takeout restaurants in the United States, Canada, Europe, and Japan. In the Philippines it is called sopang mais.

The soup may be derived from tofu-crab soup, a soup also found in restaurants in North America.

See also

 Egg drop soup
 List of Chinese soups
 List of crab dishes
 List of maize dishes
 List of seafood dishes
 List of soups

References

External links
Simple Chinese soup recipe

American Chinese cuisine
Canadian Chinese cuisine
Chinese soups
Crab dishes
Dishes featuring sweet corn
Surimi
Vegetable soups